Eino Kilpi (23 October 1910 – 27 November 1977) was a Finnish footballer. He played in two matches for the Finland national football team from 1937 to 1938. He was also part of Finland's squad for the football tournament at the 1936 Summer Olympics, but he did not play in any matches.

References

External links
 

1910 births
1977 deaths
Finnish footballers
Finland international footballers
Footballers from Helsinki
Association football midfielders
20th-century Finnish people